This is a list of the Tamil Muslim population per city. The population figures given is based on the number of people living within the town/city limits only.

Districts with highest percentage of Tamil Muslims as per 2011 census

See also
 Tamil population per nation
 Tamil population by cities
 States of India by Tamil speakers
 Tamil Christian population by cities
 Tamil Loanwords in other languages
 Tamil language
 Tamil people
 List of countries and territories where Tamil is an official language

References 

Tamil Muslim
Tamil Muslim
Islam-related lists
Population